Lieutenant General Sir Arthur Lyttelton-Annesley  (2 September 1837 – 16 February 1926) was a British Army officer who became Commander-in-Chief, Scotland.

Military career
Educated at Harrow School, Lyttelton-Annesley was commissioned into the 11th Hussars in July 1854. He took part in the Siege of Sebastopol in Winter 1854 and the Battle of the Chernaya in August 1855 during the Crimean War. He went out to India in 1866 and then returned to England to take command of his regiment in 1877 before being appointed Assistant-Adjutant-General of the Horse Guards in 1878 and then Adjutant-General of the Bombay Army in 1883. He went on to command the troops in the North British District in 1888 before retiring in 1893.

In 1896 he was given the colonelcy of the 12th (Prince of Wales's Royal) Lancers, transferring in 1902 to be colonel of the 11th Hussars until his death in 1926. He was invested Knight Commander of the Order of the Bath (KCB) in the 1923 New Year Honours.

References

 

|-

|-

1837 births
1926 deaths
People educated at Harrow School
British Army lieutenant generals
Knights Commander of the Order of the Bath
Knights Commander of the Royal Victorian Order
11th Hussars officers
12th Royal Lancers officers